Rapunzel is a character in a fairy tale recorded by the Brothers Grimm.

Rapunzel may also refer to:

 Rapunzel (book), 1997 children's picture book illustrated by Paul O. Zelinsky

Other characters
 Rapunzel (Tangled), Disney's version of Rapunzel and the heroine of Tangled
 Rapunzel (Once Upon a Time), a character from the ABC television series Once Upon a time
 Rapunzel (Shrek), a character from the Shrek film series
 Rapunzel (MÄR), a character in the manga and anime Märchen Awakens Romance

Music
 "Rapunzel" (Daniela Mercury song), 1997
 "Rapunzel", a song by Dave Matthews Band from Before These Crowded Streets, 1998
 "Rapunzel", a song by Drapht from The Life of Riley, 2011
 "Rapunzel", a song by Emilie Autumn from Enchant, 2003
 "Rapunzel", a song by Lenna Kuurmaa from Lenna, 2010
 "Rappunzel", a song by Megaherz from Kopfschuss, 1998

Plants

 Rapunzel, a common name for the plant Campanula rapunculus
 Rapunzel plant, a common name for the plant Cynanchum viminale
 Rapunzel, a common name for plants in the genus Phyteuma
 Rapunzel, a common name for the plant Valerianella locusta

See also
 Barbie as Rapunzel, a direct-to-video Barbie movie based on the Brothers Grimm fairy tale